Ucieszków  is a village in the administrative district of Gmina Pawłowiczki, within Kędzierzyn-Koźle County, Opole Voivodeship, in south-western Poland.

See also
 Territorial changes of Poland after World War II

References

Villages in Kędzierzyn-Koźle County